The Little Wichita River is a river in Texas.

See also
List of rivers of Texas
Geology of Wichita Falls, Texas
Little Red River (Texas)

References

USGS Geographic Names Information Service
USGS Hydrologic Unit Map - State of Texas (1974)

Rivers of Texas
Tributaries of the Red River of the South